Betrayal is an American drama television series that aired on ABC from September 29, 2013, to January 19, 2014. The series was developed by David Zabel and starred Hannah Ware. It is based on the Dutch drama series Overspel, broadcast by VARA. The pilot episode was directed by Patty Jenkins. Betrayal joined ABC's Sunday line-up after ABC's dramas, Once Upon a Time and Revenge.

On May 9, 2014, ABC canceled Betrayal after one season.

Premise
The series stars Hannah Ware as photographer Sara Hanley who begins an affair with Jack McAllister (played by Stuart Townsend), a lawyer for a powerful family. Both married to other people, Jack and Sara find themselves drawn to one another. The premise also revolves a murder trial which involves both of them on separate sides, complicating matters further.

Cast and characters

Main
 Hannah Ware as Sara Hanley
 Henry Thomas as T.J. Karsten
 Wendy Moniz as Elaine McAllister
 Chris Johnson as Drew Stafford
 Braeden Lemasters as Victor McAllister
 Elizabeth McLaughlin as Valerie McAllister
 Stuart Townsend as Jack McAllister
 James Cromwell as Thatcher Karsten

Recurring
 Helena Mattsson as Brandy Korskaya
 Merrin Dungey as Alissa Barnes
 Brendan Hines as Aidan
 Roxana Brusso as Serena Sanguillen
 Sofia Black-D'Elia as Jules
 Carmen Roman as Constance Mrozek

Episodes

Broadcast

The show premiered in South Africa on M-Net on Saturday 19 October 2013 at 20:30. The Republic of Ireland's public service broadcaster RTÉ Television's RTÉ Two broadcasts the series at 22:00 every Tuesday from October 29, 2013. On August 29, 2013, it was announced that Channel 5 had bought the UK rights to the series, which it began airing Friday 18 April 2014. Italy's public service broadcaster RAI 1 broadcast the series from July 25, 2014, with the title of the show being translated literally as Tradimenti. In Australia on Network Seven the series was broadcast from November 23, 2015.

Ratings

References

External links
 

2010s American drama television series
2013 American television series debuts
2014 American television series endings
American Broadcasting Company original programming
American television series based on Dutch television series
American television soap operas
English-language television shows
Television series by ABC Studios
Television shows set in Chicago